The Fourth Army of the Ottoman Empire (Turkish: Dördüncü Ordu) was one of the field armies of the Ottoman Army. It was formed in the middle nineteenth century, during Ottoman military reforms.

The army did not survive the WWI battles in Palestine and Syria.

Formations

Order of Battle, 1877
In 1877, it was stationed in Anatolia. It was composed of:
Infantry: Five line regiments and six rifle battalions
Cavalry: Three line regiments
Artillery: One line regiment (12 batteries)
Engineer: One sapper company

Order of Battle, 1908
After the Young Turk Revolution and the establishment of the  Second Constitutional Era on 3 July 1908, the new government initiated a major military reform. Army headquarters were modernized. The Fourth Army's new operational area was Caucasia and its many troops were scattered along the frontier to keep an eye on the Russian Empire. It commanded the following active divisions and other units:
7th Infantry Division (Yedinci Fırka)
8th Infantry Division (Sekicinci Fırka)
19th Infantry Division (On Dokuzuncu Fırka)
4th Artillery Division (Dördüncü Topçu Fırkası)
Erzurum Fortress Artillery Regiment

The Fourth Army also had inspectorate functions for four Redif (reserve) divisions:
13th Erzincan Reserve Infantry Division (On Üçüncü Erzincan Redif Fırkası)
14th Trabzon Reserve Infantry Division (On Dördüncü Trabzon Redif Fırkası)
15th Diyarbekir Reserve Infantry Division (On Beşinci Diyarbekir Redif Fırkası)
16th Sivas Reserve Infantry Division (On Altıncı Sivas Redif Fırkası)

Order of Battle, 1911 
With further reorganizations of the Ottoman Army, to include the creation of corps level headquarters, by 1911 the Army's headquarters were Baghdad. Before the First Balkan War in 1911, the Army was structured as:
Army Headquarters, Baghdad
XII Corps, Musul
35th Infantry Division, Musul
36th Infantry Division, Kerkük
XIII Corps, Baghdad
37th Infantry Division, Baghdad
38th Infantry Division, Basra

World War I

Order of Battle, November 1914
In November 1914, the army was structured as:
Fourth Army (Syria)
VIII Corps
23rd Division
25th Division
27th Division
XII Corps
35th Division
36th Division

Order of Battle, Late April 1915
In April 1915, the army was structured as:
Fourth Army (Syria)
VIII Corps
8th Division
10th Division
23rd Division
25th Division
27th Division
XII Corps
35th Division
36th Division

Order of Battle, Late Summer 1915, January 1916
In late Summer 1915, January 1916, the army was structured as:
Fourth Army (Syria-Palestine)
VIII Corps
23rd Division
24th Division
27th Division
XII Corps
41st Division
42nd Division
46th Division

Order of Battle, August, December 1916

Between August and December 1916, the army was structured as:
Fourth Army (Syria-Palestine)
VIII Corps
3rd Division
23rd Division
24th Division
27th Division
XII Corps
41st Division
42nd Division
43rd Division
46th Division

Order of Battle, August 1917
In August 1917, the army was structured as:
Fourth Army (Syria-Palestine)
3rd Cavalry Division
VIII Corps
48th Division
XII Corps
23rd Division
44th Division
XV Corps
43rd Division
XX Corps
16th Division
54th Division
XXII Corps
3rd Division
7th Division
53rd Division

On 26 September the Fourth Army headquarters moved to Damascus, dividing its area of responsibility in half, leaving Cemal Pasha answerable for Syria and western Arabia.

Order of Battle, January, June 1918
Between January and June 1918, the army was structured as follows:
Fourth Army (commanded by Jemal) (Syria-West Arabia)
VIII Corps (commanded by Ali Fuad Bey)
43rd Division
48th Division
XII Corps
23rd Division
41st Division
44th Division
Hejaz Corps
58th Division
Provisional Infantry Divisions x 3

Order of Battle, September 1918
In September 1918, the army was structured as:
Fourth Army (Mirliva Mersinli Cemal Pasha)
II Corps (Miralay Galatalı Şevket Bey)
62nd Division
Provisional Divisions x 3
Jordan Group
24th Division
3rd Cavalry Division
VIII Corps (Miralay Yasin Hilmi Bey)
48th Division
Umman Provisional Division

Sources

References

 

Field armies of the Ottoman Empire
Military units and formations of the Ottoman Empire in World War I
History of Damascus